John Bingham (31 March 1942 – 6 December 2003) was a British classical pianist. He was born and died in Sheffield, Yorkshire.

Notable students include Peter Arnold and Irina Lyakhovskaya.

Discography 
JOHN BINGHAM PLAYS CHOPIN: Sonata No.2, Andante Spianato & Grande Polonaise, 2 Ètudes Db, Nocturne. Meridian Records
LUDWIG VAN BEETHOVEN: Diabelli Variations Op. 120, Theme and Six Variations Op. 34. Meridian Records
LUDWIG VAN BEETHOVEN: Fantasie Op. 77, Sonata Op. 78, Eroica Variations Op. 35, Sonata Op. 111. Meridian Records
BOHEMIAN VIOLIN: Suk, Janaçek, Kubelik, Drdla, Nedbal, Dvorak, Fibich. Oliver Butterworth/J.Bingham. Meridian Records
SCHUBERT SONGS ARRANGED BY LISZT. Meridian Records
BEETHOVEN: Piano Concertos Nos 4 and 5. J.Bingham/Singapore Symphony Orchestra/Ch.Hoey. Meridian Records
CHOPIN: Etudes Opus 10 & 25. Meridian Records
ELGAR: Piano Quintet. J.Bingham/Medici String Quartet. Meridian Records
SCHUMANN: Sinfonische Etüden. Bayer Records
LISZT: Mephisto Pieces. Thorophon Records
LISZT: Malediction. J.Bingham/Ensemble 13/M.Reichert. Deutsche Harmonia Mundi
SCHUBERT: Quintet The Trout. J.Bingham/Zeus Ensemble. Cirrus Records
SCHLEGEL: Piano Quartet. J.Bingham/E.Perry/P.Pacey/D.Ferschtmann. NM Classics

References 

British classical pianists
2003 deaths
1942 births
Musicians from Sheffield
20th-century British pianists
20th-century English musicians